Eoin Reid (born 27 December 1984) is an Irish hurler who plays for Kilkenny Senior Championship club Ballyhale Shamrocks. He played for the Kilkenny senior hurling team for five years, during which time he usually lined out as a corner-forward.

Reid began his hurling career at club level with Ballyhale Shamrocks. He broke onto the club's top adult team as a 16-year-old in 2002 and enjoyed his greatest successes as part of the club's All-Ireland Championship-winning teams in 2007, 2010 and 2015 2019 2020 Reid has also won six Leinster Championship medals and nine Kilkenny Championship medals. His early prowess also saw him win a Dr. Croke Cup with St. Kieran's College and 3 Fitzgibbon Cup medals with Waterford Institute of Technology.

At inter-county level, Reid was part of the successful Kilkenny minor team that won the All-Ireland Championship in 2002 before later winning an All-Ireland Championship with the under-21 team in 2004. He joined the Kilkenny senior team in 2006. From his debut, Reid was better known as a panellist rather than a member of the starting fifteen made a combined total of 10 National League and Championship appearances in a career that ended in 2010. During that time he was part of four All-Ireland Championship-winning teams – in 2006, 2007, 2008 and 2009. Reid also secured four consecutive Leinster Championship medals and two National Hurling League medals. He was effectively let go from the Kilkenny team in 2010.

Reid's uncle, Richie Reid, and his brothers, T. J. and Richie, have also enjoyed All-Ireland success with Kilkenny.

Career statistics

Honours

St. Kieran's College
All-Ireland Colleges Senior Hurling Championship (1): 2003
Leinster Colleges Senior Hurling Championship (2): 2002, 2003

Waterford Institute of Technology
Fitzgibbon Cup (3): 2005,2006,2008

Ballyhale Shamrocks
All-Ireland Senior Club Hurling Championship (5): 2007, 2010, 2015, 2019, 2020
Leinster Senior Club Hurling Championship (7): 2006, 2008, 2009, 2014, 2018, 2019, 2020
Kilkenny Senior Hurling Championship (10): 2006, 2007, 2008, 2009, 2012, 2014, 2018, 2019, 2020, 2021
Kilkenny Under-21 Hurling Championship (4):  2003, 2004, 2005, 2006

Kilkenny
All-Ireland Senior Hurling Championship (4): 2006, 2007, 2008, 2009
Leinster Senior Hurling Championship (4): 2006, 2007, 2008, 2009
National Hurling League (2): 2006, 2009
All-Ireland Under-21 Hurling Championship (1): 2004
Leinster Under-21 Hurling Championship (1): 2004, 2005
All-Ireland Minor Hurling Championship (1): 2002
Leinster Minor Hurling Championship (1): 2002

References

1984 births
Living people
Waterford IT hurlers
Ballyhale Shamrocks hurlers
Kilkenny inter-county hurlers